A kangaroo word is a word that contains all the letters of one of its synonyms, called a joey word,  arranged so that these letters appear in the same order in both words.  For example, the word action is a kangaroo word containing the joey word act; the words in[flammable] and
[malign]ant also each include their own synonyms. In the kangaroo word, the letters of the joey word may also be separated, as in [ma]scu[l]in[e], which contains the letters of male scattered throughout. Some compilers in fact require that the letters of the joey word not be consecutive within the kangaroo word (for example: borough carries burgh, but the letters are not in the normal order) or may stipulate that the kangaroo and joey words be etymologically unrelated, so that in both cases words such as action (act), inflammable (flammable) and malignant (malign) would not qualify.

Kangaroo words were originally popularized as a word game by Ben O'Dell in an article for The American Magazine, volume 151, during the 1950s, later reprinted in Reader's Digest.

The phrase kangaroo word is derived from the fact that kangaroos carry their young, known as joeys, in a body pouch. Likewise, kangaroo words carry their joey words within themselves. A twin kangaroo is a kangaroo word that contains two joey words (for example: container features both tin and can, magister features both master and mister).  In contrast, an anti-kangaroo word is a word that contains its antonym (for example: covert carries overt, animosity carries amity). A grand kangaroo is a kangaroo word which has two joeys, one of which is in the pouch of the other. For instance, alone is a grand kangaroo since it contains lone, which carries its own synonym one.

References

External links
Purple Rose Puzzles
Word games